Lynds 1616 is a very opaque dark nebula that is apparently a part of NGC 1788, involved in the Southwest part of it. It is most distinct due south of NGC 1788's central region.

Lynds 1616 is located in the constellation Orion, at RA 05h 06m 54.0s  and Dec: −03° 21' 00" (Epoch 2000).

Dark nebulae
Orion (constellation)